North Dakota Highway 294 (ND 294) is a  east–west state highway in the U.S. state of North Dakota. It is unsigned throughout its entire duration. ND 294's western terminus is at Interstate 29 (I-29) in Fargo, and the eastern terminus is at U.S. Route 81 Business (US 81 Bus.) in Fargo.

Major intersections

Gallery

References

294
Transportation in Cass County, North Dakota
Fargo, North Dakota